Boyat (also, Bayat) is a village and municipality in the Neftchala Rayon of Azerbaijan.  It has a population of 2,472.  The municipality consists of the villages of Boyat, Balıcallı, and Dördlər.

References 

Populated places in Neftchala District